Grafs of GRAFS may refer to:

GRAFS, human gene family
Grandpa Graf's, American soft drink

People
Raitis Grafs (born 1981), Latvian basketball player
Gunnar Graps-Grāfs (1951–2004), Estonian musician

See also
Graf (disambiguation)